Al-Safsaf is a town in northwestern Syria, administratively part of the Latakia Governorate, located north of Latakia on the shores of Mashqita Lake. Nearby localities include Ayn al-Bayda, Al-Shamiyah and Burj Islam to the west, al-Bahluliyah to the east and Mushayrafet al-Samouk to the southwest. According to the Syria Central Bureau of Statistics, al-Safsaf had a population of 3,259 in the 2004 census. Its inhabitants are predominantly Alawites.

References

Populated places in Latakia District
Alawite communities in Syria